Anthony Joshua vs Dominic Breazeale was a heavyweight professional boxing match contested between undefeated IBF champion Anthony Joshua, and the IBF's number 13 ranked contender, Dominic Breazeale. The bout took place on 25 June 2016 at The O2 Arena in London, England. Joshua defeated Breazeale, retaining his heavyweight title via seventh-round technical knockout (TKO).

Background
Following Joshua's win over Charles Martin on 9 April, a second-round technical knockout (TKO) to capture the IBF heavyweight title, a shortlist of potential opponents for Joshua's first defence included former WBC champion Bermane Stiverne, former world title challenger Eric Molina and the IBF's number 13 ranked undefeated contender Dominic Breazeale. On 21 April, Joshua revealed his next fight would take place on 25 June at The O2 Arena, with Breazeale being announced as the opponent a few days later.

The Fight

With not much action in the opener, a clean left hook from Joshua was the highlight of the round. In the second, Joshua began putting combination punches together and throwing at will. In the final minute, a right uppercut and left hook sent the American staggering across the ring. Breazeale began round three with a swollen right eye, a round in which both fighters began trading power punches, with Joshua snapping Breazeale's head back with stiff jabs and a looping left hook in the final seconds of the round. Round four saw much of the same from Joshua, with Breazeale's punch output slowing, Joshua controlled the round with jabs and power punches. Near the halfway point of round five, Joshua landed a left hook to momentarily stun Breazeale, followed by a brief moment of success by the challenger with a right hand. The sixth was a slow-paced round, with Breazeale finding the target, resulting in a bloodied nose for Joshua. The end came in the seventh, with Breazeale backing up against the ropes, Joshua unloaded a barrage of punches to send the American to the canvas. Breazeale beat the referee's count of ten, only to be backed up again with a flurry of punches, ending with a left hand to send the challenger down for the second time and prompting the referee to call a halt to the fight. At the time of the stoppage, 1 minute 1 second into the round, Joshua was ahead on the scorecards, with all three judges scoring the bout 60–54.

Fight card

See also
List of IBF heavyweight champions

References

2016 in boxing
2016 in British sport
June 2016 sports events in the United Kingdom
2016 sports events in London
International sports competitions in London
International Boxing Federation heavyweight championship matches
Pay-per-view boxing matches
Boxing matches involving Anthony Joshua